Anadara diluvii is an extinct species of saltwater bivalves, ark clams, in the family Arcidae.

Description
The two valves are symmetrical to each other, but the sides are asymmetrical. The shell have about 30-35 ribs. The inner edge is strongly serrated.

Fossil records

This species is known in the fossil record from the Oligocene period to the Quaternary period (age range: 23.03 to 0.012 million years ago).

Distribution
Fossils have been found  in the Quaternary of Spain. In the Pliocene of Algeria, Cyprus, Greece, Italy, Spain, in the Miocene of Belgium, Bulgaria, Cyprus, Germany, Greece, Italy, Poland, Romania, Slovakia, Spain and in the Oligocene of Austria and Hungary.

Bibliography
 Lamarck, J.B.P.A. de. (1805). Suite des mémoires sur les fossiles des environs de Paris. Annales du Muséum National d'Histoire Naturelle. 6: 214-221. Paris., available online at Biodiversity Heritage Library - page(s): 219
 Zamouri-Langar, N.; Chouba, L.; Ajjabi Chebil, L.; Mrabet, R.; El Abed, A. (2011). Les coquillages bivalves des côtes tunisiennes. Institut National des Sciences et Technologies de la Mer: Salammbô. . 128 pp.
 Powell A W B, New Zealand Mollusca, William Collins Publishers Ltd, Auckland, New Zealand 1979 
 Antoni Hoffman  Growth allometry in a bivalve Anadara diluvii (Lamarck) from the Badenian (Miocene) Korytnica Clays, Poland Acta Palaeontologica Polonica 23 (1), 1978: 41-49

References

External links
 
 Encyclopedia of Life
 NCBI
 PESI
 Discover life

diluvii